This article lists the team squads of the  2002 FIFA U-19 Women's World Championship, held in Canada from 17 August to 1 September 2002.

Group A

Canada

Denmark

Japan

Nigeria

Group B

Brazil

France
Head coach: Bruno Bini

Germany
Head coach: Silvia Neid & Tina Theune

Mexico
Head coach: Leonardo Cuéllar

Group C

Australia
Head coach: Mike Mulvey

England

Chinese Taipei

United States

References

External links 
Canada 2002 part 2

Fifa U-19 Women's World Championship Squads, 2002
FIFA U-20 Women's World Cup squads
2002 in youth association football